The following highways are numbered 742:

Costa Rica
 National Route 742

United States
Florida
  Florida State Road 742
North Carolina

Territories
  Puerto Rico Highway 742